Amo THI & E Interurban Depot/Substation, also known as Amo Interurban Depot, is a historic interurban train station located at Amo, Hendricks County, Indiana.

Design
The building consists of a small brick passenger/cargo depot with a large, two-story repair substation at the rear.  It has Romanesque Revival and Queen Anne style design elements. The passenger depot section is topped by a series of red clay tile hipped roofs.

The building is of the same design as the company's Plainfield Depot.

History
It was built in 1907 by the Terre Haute, Indianapolis and Eastern Traction Company. Interurban transportation for Amo ceased on January 10, 1940.

The building was renovated in the 2000s for use as a library and community center. It was added to the National Register of Historic Places in 2007.

See also
THI and E Interurban Depot-Substation

References

Railway stations on the National Register of Historic Places in Indiana
Romanesque Revival architecture in Indiana
Queen Anne architecture in Indiana
Railway stations in the United States opened in 1907
National Register of Historic Places in Hendricks County, Indiana
Transportation buildings and structures in Hendricks County, Indiana
Railway buildings and structures on the National Register of Historic Places in Indiana
Railway buildings and structures on the National Register of Historic Places
Industrial buildings and structures on the National Register of Historic Places in Indiana
Former railway stations in Indiana